Walter Keller is a mathematician, physicist, researcher, designer, and inventor.  He designed and holds the patent on the first implantable atrial synchronous heart pacemaker; he designed a demand circuit critical to the controls of the artificial heart; and he pioneered the first remotely programmable computer implantable prosthesis.

References
 

Year of birth missing (living people)
Living people
University of Arkansas alumni
University of Arkansas at Little Rock alumni